Chernetskoye is a rural locality (a selo) in Yurovskoye Rural Settlement, Gryazovetsky District, Vologda Oblast, Russia. The population was 43 as of 2002.

Geography 
Chernetskoye is located 16 km west of Gryazovets (the district's administrative centre) by road. Skorodumka is the nearest rural locality.

References 

Rural localities in Gryazovetsky District